Nejlepší člověk is a Czech comedy film. It was released in 1954.

External links
 

1954 films
1954 comedy films
Czechoslovak comedy films
Czech comedy films
Czechoslovak black-and-white films
1950s Czech films